Heterobathra is a moth genus of the family Depressariidae.

Species
 Heterobathra bimacula Lower, 1901
 Heterobathra votiva Meyrick, 1922
 Heterobathra xiphosema Lower, 1901

References

Depressariinae